The 5th World Cup season began in December 1970 in Italy and concluded in March 1971 in Sweden.  Gustav Thöni of Italy won the first of his three consecutive overall titles. Annemarie Pröll of Austria won the women's overall title, her first of five consecutive.

Calendar

Men

Ladies

Men

Overall

In Men's Overall World Cup 1970/71 the best three downhills, best three giant slaloms and best three slaloms count. 22 racers had a point deduction.

Downhill

In Men's Downhill World Cup 1970/71 the best 3 results count.

Giant Slalom

Slalom

Jean-Noël Augert won five races and won the cup with maximum points

Ladies

Overall

In Women's Overall World Cup 1970/71 the best three downhills, best three giant slaloms and best three slaloms count. 18 racers had a point deduction.

Downhill

In Women's Downhill World Cup 1970/71 the best 3 results count.

Giant Slalom

Annemarie Pröll won the cup with maximum points by winning the last three competitions.

Slalom

In Women's Slalom World Cup 1970/71 the best 3 results count.

Nations Cup

Overall

Men

Ladies

Medal table

References

External links
FIS-ski.com - World Cup standings - 1971

FIS Alpine Ski World Cup
Alpine Skiing World Cup, 1971
Alpine Skiing World Cup, 1971